Eliyahu de Vidas (1518–1587, Hebron) was a 16th-century rabbi in Ottoman Palestine. He was primarily a disciple of Rabbis Moses ben Jacob Cordovero (known as the Ramak) and also Isaac Luria. De Vidas is known for his expertise in the Kabbalah. He wrote Reshit Chochmah, or "The Beginning of Wisdom," a pietistic work that is still widely studied by Orthodox Jews today. Just as his teacher Rabbi Moses Cordovero created an ethical work according to kabbalistic principles in his Tomer Devorah, Rabbi de Vidas created an even more expansive work on the spiritual life with his Reishit Chochmah.  This magnum opus is largely based on the Zohar, but also reflects a wide range of traditional sources. The author lived in Safed and Hebron, and was one of a group of prominent kabbalists living in Hebron during the late 16th and early 17th-century.

Aaron ben Menahem Mendel of Kamenitz, the first hotelier in the Land of Israel, references his visit to the grave of Eliyahu de Vidas in his 1839 book Sefer Korot Ha-Itim. He states, "here I write of the graves of the righteous to which I paid my respects." After describing the Cave of Machpela and the tombs of such Biblical figures as Ruth and Jesse, Othniel Ben Knaz and Abner Ben Ner, he reports, "I also went to a grave said to be that of the Righteous Rav, author of "Reshit Hokhma." Today the grave site has been refurbished  and can be visited in the Old Jewish Cemetery in Hebron.

Notes

References
 
 
 Photo of the grave of Eliyahu de Vidas from the Old Jewish Cemetery of Hebron
 Video of the grave of Eliyahu de Vidas from the Old Jewish Cemetery of Hebron (starts at 1:19)
 Video of the grave of Eliyahu de Vidas from the Old Jewish Cemetery of Hebron (starts at 11:32)

1518 births
1592 deaths
16th-century rabbis from the Ottoman Empire
Kabbalists
Rabbis in Hebron
Rabbis in Safed
People from Hebron
Rabbis in Ottoman Galilee
Sephardi rabbis in Ottoman Palestine